Hypolamprus angulalis is a moth of the family Thyrididae first described by Frederic Moore in 1888. It is found in Malaysia, Myanmar and Sri Lanka.

References

Moths of Asia
Moths described in 1888
Thyrididae